Klassen is a surname. Notable people with the surname include:

Ben Klassen (1918–1993), American white supremacist and founder of the religion Creativity
Cindy Klassen (born 1979), Canadian skater
Danny Klassen (born 1975), American-Canadian baseball player
Johann Peter Klassen (1889–1947), German-Canadian poet
Kenneth Klassen (born 1951), Canadian sex tourist
Linda Klassen, Canadian politician
Owen Klassen (born 1991), Canadian basketball player
Peter P. Klassen (born 1926), Paraguayan Mennonite historian
Sarah Klassen (born 1932), Canadian poet
Terry Klassen, Canadian voice actor and voice director

See also
Classen (surname)
Kelasen, a village in Sarawak, Malaysia, whose alternative name is Klassen
Klaassen

Russian Mennonite surnames